Electoral history of George Bush may refer to:

 Electoral history of George H. W. Bush, 41st president of the United States (1989–1993)
 Electoral history of George W. Bush, 43rd president of the United States (2001–2009)
 Electoral history of George P. Bush, 28th land commissioner of Texas (since 2015)